Cirrhimuraena tapeinoptera is an eel in the family Ophichthidae (worm/snake eels). It was described by Pieter Bleeker in 1863. It is a tropical, marine eel which is known from the Indo-West Pacific.

References

Ophichthidae
Fish described in 1863